The 2021 Gippsland Trophy was a tournament on the 2021 WTA Tour. It was played on outdoor hard courts in Melbourne, Australia. It was organised as a lead-up tournament to the 2021 Australian Open, and was held at the same venue, due to other tournaments in Australia being cancelled as a result from the COVID-19 pandemic. This tournament took place simultaneously with the 2021 Yarra Valley Classic and the 2021 Grampians Trophy. Players who had originally intended to participate in this tournament or the Yarra Valley Classic, but were forced to undergo strict quarantine measures upon arrival in Australia, were able to participate in the 2021 Grampians Trophy. The entry list of 2021 Australian Open was used to determine the entry list of this tournament; with half the players (selected randomly) playing the Gippsland Trophy, and the other half playing the 2021 Yarra Valley Classic.

Champions

Singles

  Elise Mertens def.  Kaia Kanepi, 6–4, 6–1

Doubles

  Barbora Krejčíková /  Kateřina Siniaková def.  Chan Hao-ching /  Latisha Chan, 6–3, 7–6(7–4)

Points and prize money

Point distribution

Prize money

*per team

Singles main-draw entrants

Seeds

1 Rankings are as of 25 January 2021

Other entrants
The following players received wildcards:
  Destanee Aiava
  Olivia Gadecki
  Arina Rodionova
  Astra Sharma

The following players received entry using a protected ranking into the Australian Open singles main draw, and hence this tournament as well:
  Katie Boulter
  Anastasia Potapova
  Wang Yafan

The following players received entry from the Australian Open qualifying draw:
  Tímea Babos
  Sara Errani
  Mayo Hibi
  Kaja Juvan
  Rebecca Marino
  Whitney Osuigwe
  Chloé Paquet
  Valeria Savinykh

The following players received entry into this tournament as they were potential lucky losers for the Australian Open singles main draw:
  Mihaela Buzărnescu
  Margarita Gasparyan
  Varvara Lepchenko
  Anna Karolína Schmiedlová
  Lesia Tsurenko

The following players received entry as an alternate:
  Caty McNally
  Monica Niculescu

Withdrawals
Before the tournament
  Zarina Diyas → replaced by  Monica Niculescu
  Nao Hibino → replaced by  Caty McNally
During the tournament
  Karolína Muchová
  Naomi Osaka

Doubles main-draw entrants

Seeds 

 Rankings are as of 25 January 2021

Other entrants
The following pairs received a wildcard into the doubles main draw:
  Destanee Aiava /  Astra Sharma
  Daria Gavrilova /  Simona Halep
  Abbie Myers /  Ivana Popovic

The following pair received entry using a protected ranking:
  Mona Barthel /  Zhu Lin

Withdrawals
During the tournament
  Daria Gavrilova /  Simona Halep

References

External links

2021
2021 WTA Tour
2021 in Australian tennis
January 2021 sports events in Australia
February 2021 sports events in Australia